Homegrown was a monthly drum and bass event held at Mercury Live, Cape Town. It featured several international and local acts, including Dieselboy, Pendulum, Counterstrike, Donny, Raiden, Eye-D, Matt Impact, Robyn Chaos, Temper D, Nymfo, SFR and Hyphen.

Owned and managed by Algorythm Recordings, the event took place every first Saturday of the month, and was the longest running drum and bass event in South Africa. The last Homegrown was held on 3 November 2012. It has subsequently spawned a successor event called 'Pressure', which occupies Homegrown's original venue and schedule, hosted by SFR, Hyphen and RudeOne.

History
The first Homegrown event was held in September 2000 at The Jam (now Mercury Live). The event was masterminded by Algorythm Recordings. The idea behind it is to get South African drum and bass crews Algorythm, Sublime and Krushed & Sorted under one roof, once a month, for the first time. The focus is promoting artists who produce drum and bass locally, hence the name "Homegrown".

In 2001, Mercury Live offered Homegrown a monthly residency, making it a permanent fixture in the South African drum and bass scene. With drum and bass music requiring well-engineered, large sound systems, Algorythm developed a long working relationship with Hellfire Sound.

Artist line-ups
Since its establishment in 2000, Homegrown has hosted a large range of artists, with headlining acts including Pendulum, Counterstrike, Dieselboy, Donny, Raiden, Eye-D, Matt Impact, Robyn Chaos, Temper D, MC Messinian and Nymfo.

The monthly event has also been a launching platform for South African drum and bass artists, with various acts such as SFR, RudeOne, MFU, Niskerone, MC Skywalker, Psyke and the Anti Alias performing multiple times. Resident DJs include Counterstrike and Hyphen.

Flyer
Printed on perforated paper, Homegrown flyers are commonly used as gerrick or filters in the preparation of cannabis smoking. Early flyer and logo designs depicted images of marijuana plants and leaves. This was later changed to appeal to a much wider audience, however the perforated flyer is still in use.

Recent Homegrown flyers have contained QR Codes, storing URL data to downloadable MP3 and desktop wallpapers. All flyers and event visuals are designed by Eaton Crous himself.

References

External links

Official Algorythm Website
Homegrown Facebook
Homegrown Flyer Archive Flickr

Drum and bass events
Recurring events established in 2000
Festivals in Cape Town
2000 establishments in South Africa
2012 disestablishments in South Africa
Electronic music festivals in South Africa